Hugh Edwards may refer to:

Hugh Edwards (curator) (1903–1986), American curator of photography in Chicago
Hugh Edwards (rower) (1906–1972), English Olympic rower
Hugh Edwards (journalist) (born 1932), Western Australian author and marine photographer
Hugh Edwards (politician) (1869–1945), British Liberal Party politician

See also
Hughie Edwards (1914–1982), Australian Victoria Cross recipient
Huw Edwards (disambiguation)